Dragonlord or Dragon Lord may refer to:
 Dragon Lord, a 1982 Hong Kong kung fu film starring Jackie Chan
 Dragonlord (band), the American symphonic black metal band
Dragonlord (board game), a 1976 board game of aerial dragon combat
 Dragon Lord (comics), a fictional character in the Marvel Universe
 Dragon Lord (video game), the 1990 video game released for Amiga, Atari ST, and MS-DOS
 The Dragon Lord (Drake novel), a 1979 novel by David Drake
 The Dragon Lord (Morwood novel), a 1986 novel by Peter Morwood
 The Dragon Lord (Chivalry & Sorcery), a 1984 fantasy role-playing game adventure
 DragonLords, a British role-playing game magazine
 "Dragonlords" (Joanne Bertin), a race of beings that change from human to dragon at will in Joanne Bertin's novels
 The Dragonlord, the villain from the video game Dragon Warrior
 Dragon Lord, the main villain from the TV show Ninja Turtles: The Next Mutation

See also
Dragon King